Brian or Bryan Hughes is the name of:

 Brian G. Hughes (1849–1924), US businessman and practical joker
 Bryan Desmond Hughes (1888–1918), Australian soldier and rugby union player
 Brian Hughes (footballer, born 1937) (1937–2018), Welsh international footballer
 Brian Hughes (footballer, born 1962), former Swindon Town and Cheltenham Town footballer
 Bryan Hughes (born 1976), English footballer
 Brian Hughes (musician) (born 1955), smooth jazz guitarist
 Bryan Tewell Hughes (born 1966), electronic music composer and producer of AeTopus
 Bryan Hughes (politician) (born 1969), Republican member of the Texas Senate from Mineola, Texas
 Brian Hughes (jockey) (born 1985), Irish jockey